Sabitra Bhandari, popularly known as Samba, is a Nepali professional footballer who plays as a forward for the Nepal women's national football team. She is the highest goal scorer in Nepali women's football with 45 goals.

Career

At club level, Bhandari plays for APF Club. she became the best women striker of south Asia at the age of 20. In February 2017 she was invited to play the Maldives women's league.

Sethu FC 
She joined  Indian Women's League side  Sethu FC for the  2018-19 Indian Women's League season. In her debut match she scored 4 goals for the club against Manipur Police Sports Club on 6 May 2019. She also awarded with women of the match in her first match with Sethu FC.

International career
Bhandari represents Nepal at the international level. She participates and scores one goal against Bhutan at the 2014 SAFF Women's Championship. She represented the country during the 2016 South Asian Games, she scored two goals against Sri Lanka. She scored the only goal in a friendly victory against Malaysia on 17 December 2016.

Bhandari then played in Nepal's first match of the 2016 SAFF Women's Championship against Bhutan. She scored six goals as Nepal won 8–0 to open the tournament and scored 5 goals against Maldives in the 2nd group match.

International goals

Honours
Sethu FC
Indian Women's League: 2018–19

Gokulam Kerala
Indian Women's League: 2019–20

Individual
 Indian Women's League Top Scorer: 2019–20
Top Goal Scorer of 2016 SAFF Women's Championship,
Best Player of Pradhansenapati International women's football tournament 2013,
Seventh National Game Of Nepal 2013 women's football top goal scorer,
2019 Pulsar Sports Award woman's Player Of The year.

See also
 List of top international women's football goal scorers by country

References

Living people
Nepalese women's footballers
Nepal women's international footballers
Women's association football forwards
Indian Women's League players
Sethu FC players
Nepalese expatriate sportspeople in India
Nepalese expatriate women's footballers
Expatriate women's footballers in India
1996 births
South Asian Games silver medalists for Nepal
South Asian Games medalists in football
Gokulam Kerala FC Women players